In mathematics, an all one polynomial (AOP) is a polynomial in which all coefficients are one. Over the finite field of order two, conditions for the AOP to be irreducible are known, which allow this polynomial to be used to define efficient algorithms and circuits for multiplication in finite fields of characteristic two. The AOP is a 1-equally spaced polynomial.

Definition
An AOP of degree m has all terms from xm to x0 with coefficients of 1, and can be written as

or

or

Thus the roots of the all one polynomial of degree m are all (m+1)th roots of unity other than unity itself.

Properties
Over GF(2) the AOP has many interesting properties, including:

The Hamming weight of the AOP is m + 1, the maximum possible for its degree
The AOP is irreducible if and only if m + 1 is prime and 2 is a primitive root modulo m + 1 (over GF(p) with prime p, it is irreducible if and only if m + 1 is prime and p is a primitive root modulo m + 1)
The only AOP that is a primitive polynomial is x2 + x + 1.

Despite the fact that the Hamming weight is large, because of the ease of representation and other improvements there are efficient implementations in areas such as coding theory and cryptography.

Over , the AOP is irreducible whenever m + 1 is a prime p, and therefore in these cases, the pth cyclotomic polynomial.

References

External links

Field (mathematics)
Polynomials